Merchants & Merchandise is a 1981 role-playing game supplement for Traveller published by Paranoia Press.

Contents
Merchants & Merchandise is a book where the first half is a complete character generation system for merchants, and the second half introduces 18 new items: weapons, ships, medical aids, robots, computers, and a transporter.

Publication history
Merchants and Merchandise was written by Donald P. Rapp with Chuck Kallenbach and Cheryl Kallenbach and was published in 1981 by Paranoia Press as a 24-page book.

Reception
William A. Barton reviewed Merchants & Merchandise in The Space Gamer No. 39. Barton commented that "No Traveller player should pass this one up."

Reviews
 Different Worlds #16 (Nov., 1981)

External links

 Guide To Paranoia Press Traveller

References

Role-playing game supplements introduced in 1981
Traveller (role-playing game) supplements